Friday On My Mind is an Australian television drama miniseries, based on the lives of Australian rock band The Easybeats, which first screened on the ABC in November 2017. The series is produced by Playmaker Media and was written by Christopher Lee and directed by Matthew Saville.

Cast
 Ashley Zukerman as Ted Albert
 Christian Byers as Stevie Wright
 Will Rush as George Young
Arthur McBain as Snowy Fleet
 Mackenzie Fearnley as Harry Vanda
 Du Toit Bredenkamp as Dick Diamonde

Release
The mini series was broadcast on ABC1 on 26 November and 3 December 2017 over two nights.  Episodes were later available for streaming on the ABC's iView service.

Reception
Friday On My Mind received largely positive reviews from the press. Luke Buckmaster from The Guardian Australia praised it by saying: "Easybeats biopic plays like a concert you don't want to end". The acting in the series was praised, in particular Will Rush and Christian Byers. Although, overall the series was praised, critics did point out that the second episode wasn't as strong as the first.

References

External links
 

Australian drama television series
2017 Australian television series debuts
Biographical films about musicians
English-language television shows
Australian Broadcasting Corporation original programming
Television series by Playmaker Media
Cultural depictions of Australian men
Cultural depictions of rock musicians